Fingertip is a 2019 Indian Tamil-language streaming television series, starring Akshara Haasan, Ashwin Kakumanu, Sunaina, and Gayathrie. Figertip was directed by Srinivasan Shivakar and premiered on ZEE5 on 21 August 2019.

Overview

Cast
 Akshara Haasan as Priya
 Ashwin Kakumanu as Sanjay
 Sunaina as Rekha
 Shivaji Dev as Vijay
 Gayathrie as Sandhya
 Madhusudhan Rao as Krishnamoorthy
Sanjana Sarathy as Vidhya
 Jeeva Ravi as Ramalingam, Sanjay's assistant
 Uma Padmanabhan as Priya's mother
 Siddhartha Shankar as Varun
 Rohith Muralidharan as Raghavan

Season 1

Episodes

Season 2 

Fingertip (Season 2) is an original Tamil-Language television series directed by Srinivasan Shivakar starring Prasanna, Aparana Balamurali, Regina Cassandra, Vinoth Kishan, Kanna Ravi, and Sharath Ravi.

References

External links
Official Website
 

ZEE5 original programming
Tamil-language web series
Tamil-language thriller television series
Tamil-language crime television series
2019 Tamil-language television series debuts
Television series about social media